A leadership spill in the Australian Labor Party, the party of opposition in the Parliament of Australia, was held on 27 April 1966. It followed the long awaited challenge by party deputy-leader Gough Whitlam against incumbent leader Arthur Calwell. Calwell received 49 votes to Whitlam's 25 in a caucus ballot. After claiming victory Calwell then announced that if Labor was defeated at the impending 1966 federal election, he would not stand for the leadership again.

Results
The following table gives the ballot results:

References

Australian Labor Party leadership spills
Australian Labor Party leadership spill